Peter Lars Larson (born 1952) is an American fossil expert and president of the Black Hills Institute of Geological Research. He led the team that excavated "Sue", one of the largest and most complete  specimen of Tyrannosaurus rex found to date, and has published numerous scientific and popular works on dinosaur paleontology. He is criticized by paleontologists for his commercial enterprises and support of private collections.

Early life and education
Peter Larson grew up on a ranch near Mission, South Dakota.  He began rock hunting at the age of four on his parents' ranch. He attended the South Dakota School of Mines to study paleontology. He graduated with a bachelor's degree in 1974. Shortly after graduating college he started Black Hills Minerals.

Career

Larson founded what eventually became the Black Hills Institute in 1974. Partners Robert Farrar and (Larson's brother) Neal Larson later joined the company. In 1990, Larson led the excavation of the Tyrannosaurus rex skeleton later named "Sue". With only a bachelor's degree in geology, Larson has written and co-authored numerous publications on dinosaurs, has excavated more T. rex skeletons than any paleontologist, and his organization's work on excavation and preparation of fossils has been recognized by paleontologists Robert Bakker, Philip Currie, Phillip Manning, and Jack Horner for its quality. He was one of the first to work with T. rex bone pathologies, has worked to uncover sexual dimorphism in the chevron length of T. rex, and argues that several juvenile T. rex skeletons actually represent a distinct genus, Nanotyrannus.

In 1992, Larson's team helped to discover second largest Tyrannosaurus rex Stan. Larson, along with paleontologist Kenneth Carpenter, edited the scholarly text Tyrannosaurus Rex, the Tyrant King. Larson and his ex-wife Kristin Donnan wrote the book Rex Appeal, which relates the story of how the U.S. Government took possession of the "Sue" T. rex skeleton following its excavation, as well as the scientific work Larson was doing at the time. The pair also wrote  Bones Rock!, an acclaimed children's book about the history of paleontology and requirements on how to become a paleontologist.

In 2013 Larson and colleagues began excavating at a site located in Wyoming, US containing the remnants of three nearly complete skeletons of Triceratops. They have been involved in many excavations of notable fossils, and their work—both real skeletons and casts—are mounted and displayed in museums on several continents.

Federal lands dispute
In 1992, an acting U.S. Attorney led about 35 F.B.I. agents and 20 National Guardsmen  on a raid on the Black Hills Institute of Geological Research, Larson's company. The federal agents seized the skeleton of Sue, along with other fossils and records. Larson and associates believed  they were excavating "Sue" on private land, and had paid the owner $5,000 for the fossil, before its complete excavation and before its scientific attributes were known. However, the U.S. Attorney charged that the fossil had been illegally taken from land under Federal administration, because the deeded land fell within the borders of a Native American reservation and the parcel itself was held in "trust" by the Bureau of Indian Affairs for the benefit of its Native landowner. This provision was understood by both parties, but was not relevant at the time of excavation, since fossils, like gravel or oil, could be "severed" from the land. Owners of land held in trust could sell severable resources, but required federal oversight to sell real estate. In 1994, a Federal court changed precedent and made an unforeseen ruling, calling "Sue" part of the real estate and therefore claiming that the landowner should have received permission to sell the fossil. Although the sale of the fossil was claimed to be legitimate at the time it occurred, it was vacated by the new ruling, and "Sue's" ownership reverted  to the landowner. After the sale to the Field Museum, the landowner received $7.6 million; Larson's company received no compensation, even though it had expended upwards of $1 million in excavation and preparation of the fossil.

Following a subsequent trial on "charges mostly related to trafficking in fossils" unrelated to the "Sue" T. rex find, Larson was convicted of two felonies and two misdemeanors. Most of the other were dismissed, and the felonies—which involved customs reporting—were fraught with controversy, as government witnesses had categorized Larson's actions as lawful. Richard Battey, the judge who refused to recuse himself several times during the highly publicized case, sentenced Larson to two years in federal prison, although the convictions would normally have resulted in probation. Battey enhanced the sentence so that Larson served time as if he had been convicted of more crimes than he was.

In interviews after the case, jurors stated that 11 of 12 initial votes were for complete acquittal.

Legacy
Larson has developed a controversial standing in his field. On one hand, he fought for fair fossil-collecting regulations on public lands, and worked with government committees to find common ground as a representative of professional paleontologists, as well as publishing scientific papers. On the other hand, some academic paleontologists object to any organization's commercial selling of fossils, and find Larson's company to be the prime example of this activity.

The difference of opinion about the benefits and drawbacks of selling fossils has been a topic for more than 100 years, thanks to the rich history of collaborations between academic and professional paleontologists throughout the 20th century. These collaborations  created the primary collections that introduced the public to dinosaurs, but also introduced the idea of fiscal value to resources that some say fall into the public domain. Those academics who reject the practice claim that the high prices that fossils like "Sue" bring in the marketplace prevent public institutions from competing, as private landowners see their fossils as "crops" and are less likely to donate them.

Larson has gained supporters in academia, including John Ostrom of Yale University and Robert Bakker, Curator of Paleontology for the Houston Museum of Natural Science. Himself a colorful and sometimes controversial figure, Bakker has backed Larson as a responsible paleontologist.

Selected works

Journal articles
Larson, P and Frey, E. "Sexual Dimorphism in the Abundant Upper Cretaceous Theropod, T. rex." Journal of Vertebrate Paleontology 12, Abstract 96, 3 September 1992.

Popular books
Larson, P. and Donnan, K. "Rex Appeal". Montpelier, VT: Invisible Cities Press, 2002.
Larson, P. and Carpenter, K. "Tyrannosaurus Rex, the Tyrant King (Life of the Past)". Indiana University Press, 2008.

See also
 Sue Hendrickson, discoverer and namesake of the T. rex "Sue"
 Dinosaur renaissance
 Paleontology in South Dakota

References

External links
 Collaborator Profile, University of Manchester Paleontology 
  
 Black Hills Institute of Geological Research Inc. website
 Part 1: Wagon Ho , Interview by Bernie Harberts with Pete and Neal Larson

1952 births
Living people
American paleontologists
People from Pennington County, South Dakota
Businesspeople from South Dakota
South Dakota School of Mines and Technology alumni
People from Mission, South Dakota